The Dora Riparia (or Doire) is an alpine river, a left-hand tributary of the Po. It originates in the Cottian Alps, close to the Col de Montgenèvre in France, where it is called the Piccola Dora. Its name becomes the Dora Riparia after the confluence with the Ripa in the Argentera Valley and the Thuras de Bousson close to Cesana.

Further down the valley, in Oulx, the river grows thanks to its main upper tributary, the Dora di Bardonecchia, and before Susa is augmented by the Galambra and Cenischia. After Susa, it only receives minor tributaries: from the left, Gravio by Condove, Sessi by Caprie, and Messa by Almese, from the right Scaglione by Meana and Gravio by Villar Focchiardo. It runs through the Susa Valley, and after having crossed part of the plain of the Po and the territories of the comunes of Avigliana, Alpignano, Pianezza and Collegno, joins the Po at Turin. It is considered a "stream" (torrente) until Susa, and a river (fiume) to Turin.

It was at the confluence of the Dora Riparia and the Po that present-day Turin was founded in Roman times. Dora Riparia was there for a long time the main source of energy: already in medieval times its water was collected in canals that drove mills, water wheels and other contraptions. In the area between the confluence of Dora Riparia and Stura in the Po, where before the destruction caused by the Battle of Turin in 1706 one could find the Regio park, lies today the Parco della Colletta. One of the bridges spanning the river at Turin is Ponte Mosca.

In the 20th century, industrial and urban development significantly degenerated environmental conditions in the river; renovation work did not start until the 1990s. In 1999, the environmental protection agency ARPA (the Regional Agency for Environmental Protection) conducted a study of the entire Dora Riparia and the river Sangone, revealing a condition of serious pollution. Then, in 2002, the agro-natural park of Dora Riparia was born, financed by the comune of Collegno and the region of Po, to preserve the natural habitat, but also to integrate agricultural and river area.

References

Rivers of Provence-Alpes-Côte d'Azur
Rivers of France
Rivers of the Province of Turin
International rivers of Europe
Rivers of Italy
Rivers of Hautes-Alpes
Rivers of the Alps